Posey Township is one of eleven townships in Clay County, Indiana. As of the 2010 census, its population was 4,063 and it contained 1,706 housing units.

History
Posey Township was organized in 1828. It was named for Territorial Governor Thomas Posey.

Geography

Cities and towns
 Brazil (southwest edge)
 Staunton

Unincorporated towns
 Billtown
 Billville
 Cherryvale
 Cloverland
 Cottage Hill
 Purdy Hill
 Turner
 Twin Beach
(This list is based on USGS data and may include former settlements.)

Adjacent townships
 Dick Johnson Township (north)
 Brazil Township (northeast)
 Jackson Township (east)
 Sugar Ridge Township (southeast)
 Perry Township (south)
 Riley Township, Vigo County (southwest)
 Lost Creek Township, Vigo County (west)
 Nevins Township, Vigo County (northwest)

Major highways
  Interstate 70
  U.S. Route 40
  State Road 42
  State Road 59
  State Road 340

Cemeteries
The township contains seven cemeteries: Billtown, Clearview, Cottage Hill, German, Rhule, Summit Lawn and Summit Lawn.

References
 United States Census Bureau cartographic boundary files
 U.S. Board on Geographic Names

External links

 Indiana Township Association
 United Township Association of Indiana

Townships in Clay County, Indiana
Terre Haute metropolitan area
Townships in Indiana
1828 establishments in the United States
Populated places established in 1828